Jeon Min-gwang (Hanja:全珉洸; born 17 January 1993) is a South Korean footballer who plays as midfielder for Goyang KH FC on loan from Pohang Steelers.

Career
Jeon Min-gwang was selected by Seoul E-Land in 2015 K League draft.

For the 2019 season, he moved to Pohang Steelers.

In 2022, as a social service agent, he was loaned to a newly founded K4 League club, Goyang KH FC. At the beginning match of the season, he scored the first goal of the club against Geoje Citizen FC.

References

External links 
 

1993 births
Living people
South Korean footballers
Association football midfielders
K League 2 players
K League 1 players
K4 League players
Pohang Steelers players
Seoul E-Land FC players